The Birds comprises a pair of outdoor sculptures depicting house sparrows by Myfanwy MacLeod, installed after the 2010 Winter Olympics in Southeast False Creek Olympic Plaza, which served as the site of the 2010 Olympic Village in Vancouver, British Columbia, Canada. The work depicts one male and one female house sparrow, each approximately five metres tall, and was the first piece approved by the city's Olympic and Paralympic Public Art Program. It was inspired by Alfred Hitchcock's 1963 film of the same name, sustainability, the site's history as a shipyard, and immigration.

They were removed on November 23, 2017 for repairs, but later restored to their original location.

Background

The Birds was the first work of public art to be approved under the city's Olympic and Paralympic Public Art Program. It was installed in Southeast False Creek Olympic Plaza, which served as the site of the 2010 Olympic Village, in April 2010. MacLeod was inspired by Alfred Hitchcock's 1963 film of the same name. She has said of the piece, "I think it boils down to wanting to make something sublime for the plaza – that is something beautiful, but frightening at the same time." She has also said of its inspiration:

The Birds was also inspired by sustainability and the site's history as a shipyard, where sailors often wore sparrow tattoos. The sculptures have been called an "ode to immigration" based on MacLeod's interest in "alien species" and when non-native species are introduced to an environment (the house sparrow is not native to North America). MacLeod said: "My work for the Olympic Village tries to infuse the ordinary and commonplace sparrow with a touch of the ridiculous and the sublime. Locating this artwork in an urban plaza not only highlights what has become the 'natural' environment of the sparrow, it also reinforces the 'small' problem of introducing a foreign species and the subsequent havoc wreaked upon our ecosystems."

The sculptures were produced by Heavy Industries, with some bodywork completed by Semi-Rigid Plastic Parts Repair. The Birds was the last of the public art program's works to be installed, despite being the first approved.

Description

The birds have been described as realistic and "massive yet friendly-looking". Their bodies are made from hard coated expanded polystyrene (EPS) foam, coated with a polyurea skin and airbrush painted, all clad around a steel armature. Their cast bronze legs were sealed with wax. According to Heavy, the EPS form pieces were "glued together with pressure-sensitive adhesive, specifically formulated for bonding EPS to itself and other materials".

Reception
Marsha Lederman of The Globe and Mail called the sculptures "huge and intimidating and a bit creepy", but acknowledged the artist's intent. Explaining connection between immigration and sparrows specifically, she wrote that the birds were introduced "to satisfy cultural nostalgia for homesick Europeans. The birds were alien, exotic. They're now ubiquitous. Part of the everyday landscape. Barely noticed… Not these." Tuija Seipell of Jaunted said the sparrows were reminiscent of the bird that Flick and the Blueberries build to scare the Hoppers in the 1998 film A Bug's Life.

See also
 "The Birds" (story), a 1952 novelette by Daphne du Maurier and the inspiration for Hitchcock's film

References

External links

 Myfanwy MacLeod’s The Birds at Olympic Village Point to Fragile Biodiversity (June 2, 2010), Vancouver 21

2010 establishments in British Columbia
2010 sculptures
Animal sculptures in Canada
Sculptures of birds
Outdoor sculptures in Vancouver